St. Vincent de Paul High School is a private, Roman Catholic high school in Petaluma, California.  It is located in the Roman Catholic Diocese of Santa Rosa in California

Since 2017, Patrick Daly has served as principal.

Alumni have attended Brown University, Harvard University, Stanford University, and schools in the University of California system, among others.

References

External links
 School Website

Catholic secondary schools in California
High schools in Sonoma County, California
Petaluma, California
Roman Catholic Diocese of Santa Rosa